Aston Villa played the  1932–33 English football season in the Football League First Division.  Billy Smith remained trophy-less going into his seventh season.

Going into the New Year fixtures, the  Influenza season was creating havoc with so many ill that clubs were struggling to field full teams. The Times noted that the main threat to Arsenal came "as usual" from Aston Villa.

League table

Squad statistics

Appearances
Eric Houghton, 45 appearances
Harry Morton, 44 appearances, conceded 73
George Brown, 41 appearances
Jimmy Gibson, 41 appearances
Danny Blair, 40 appearances
Tommy Mort, 36 appearances
Billy Walker, 33 appearances
Joe Tate, 30 appearances
Jack Mandley, 28 appearances
Dai Astley, 28 appearances
Alec Talbot, 21 appearances
Joe Beresford, 20 appearances
Billy Kingdon, 18 appearances
Billy Simpson, 13 appearances
Tommy Wood, 13 appearances
Joe Nibloe, 12 appearances
Archie Watkins, 8 appearances
Reg Chester, 6 appearances
Pongo Waring, 6 appearances
Ernie Callaghan 5 appearances
Tommy Smart, 2 appearances
Teddy Bowen, 1 appearance
Ollie Tidman 1 appearance
Ken Tewkesbury 1 appearance, Conceded  0 
Arthur Cunliffe 1 appearance
Ronnie Dix 1 appearance

References

Aston Villa F.C. seasons
Aston Villa F.C. season